The Alcântara Space Center (CEA), former known as Alcântara Launch Center is a space center and launching facility of the Brazilian Space Agency in the city of Alcântara, located on Brazil's northern Atlantic coast, in the state of Maranhão. It is operated by the Brazilian Air Force. The CEA is the closest launching base to the equator. This gives the launch site a significant advantage in launching geosynchronous satellites, an attribute shared by the Guiana Space Centre.

Construction of the base began in 1982. The first launch occurred on February 21, 1990, when the sounding rocket Sonda 2 XV-53 was launched. On August 22, 2003, the explosion of the third VLS-1 (XV-03) killed 21 people.

There are also plans to launch several international rockets from Alcântara. In 2003 contracts were signed to launch Ukrainian Tsyklon-4 and Israeli Shavit rockets; In addition there are further plans to launch the Russian Proton rocket. In the beginning of 2018, Brazilian government offered the possibility to use the spaceport to several U.S. companies. The company Virgin Orbit, was selected to fly their LauncherOne rocket from Alcântara in the first half of 2023.

Public-private partnership
Companies based in Alcântara as of 2021, with the objective of orbital and sub-orbital launches, for commercial purposes or in partnership with the Brazilian government:

 C6 Launch
 Hyperion Rocket Systems
 OrionAST
 Virgin Orbit
 Innospace

As of August 2021, the Brazilian government established Ordinance No. 698, a regulation that follows the FAA 14 CFR part 450 standard, which deals with launch and re-entry licenses in order to follow the world standard in space activities.

Agreement between Brazil and the U.S.
In 2019, Brazil and the U.S. signed an agreement, with the objective of preventing unauthorized access or transfer of U.S. technologies related to the launches from Alcântara.

Structures
 Engine preparation facilities (Preparação de Propulsores - PPP)
 Payload preparation facilities (Preparação de Carga Útil - PPCU)
 Liquid-fuel loading facilities (Preparação de Carregamento de Propelentes - PCPL)
 Universal launch tower
 Mobile Integration Tower (TMI - Torre Móvel de Integração): 33x10x13m, 380tons. Used for assembly of the VLS rockets.
 Control center (Prédio de Controle Avançado - CASAMATA).
 2600m runway

List of launchpads
The Alcântara launch pads include:
 VLS Pad (with Mobile Integration Tower - TMI) 
 MRL Pad (general sounding rocket pad) 
 "Universal" pad for rockets up to 10 tons 
 A newly built pad to support Innospace's launches

Launch list
The list of flights conducted and planned from Alcântara:

Alcântara Space Center (from 2021)

Alcântara Launch Center (1982-2022)

See also 
Aerospace Operations Command Brazilian space command
Rocket Launch Sites Worldwide

References

External links
 Official site .
 Encyclopedia Astronautica about Alcantara, with maps, chronology and launch log.
 About the Alcantara Launch Center at globalsecurity.org.
 Space Today - Brazil's Atlantic Spaceports.
 Brazil spaceport threat to villages (BBC article).
 Alcântara Cyclone Space

Spaceports
Rocket launch sites
Space program of Brazil
Buildings and structures in Maranhão